Kamareddy district is a district located in the northern region of the Indian state of Telangana. The district shares boundaries with Medak, Nizamabad, Sangareddy, Siddipet and Rajanna Sircilla districts and with the state boundary of Maharashtra and Karnataka.

Geography 

The district is spread over an area of  making it the 15th largest district in the state. Kamareddy is bounded by Nizamabad district on North, Sircilla and Siddipet districts to the east respectively, it is bounded on South by Sangareddy district and Medak district and on the West and South West by Nanded district and Bidar district of Maharashtra and Karnataka states respectively.

Demographics 

 Census of India, the district has a population of 974,227. Kamareddy is the 15th most populous out of 31 districts of Telangana. The literacy rate is 48.49%. 8.24% of the population lives in urban areas. Scheduled Castes and Scheduled Tribes make up 15.77% and 8.41% of the population respectively.

At the time of the 2011 census, 72.87% of the population spoke Telugu, 9.73% Urdu, 8.57% Lambadi, 3.89% Marathi and 3.23% Kannada as their first language.

Administrative divisions 
The district has three revenue divisions of Kamareddy and Banswada and Yellareddy are sub-divided into 22 mandals. Dr. A. Sharath is the present collector of the district.

See also 
 List of districts in Telangana

References

External links 
 Official website

 
Districts of Telangana